Sparganothina costaricana is a species of moth of the family Tortricidae. It is found in Costa Rica.

The length of the forewings is about 7.1 mm. The forewings are bright yellowish gold with dark brown markings, which are darker on the costa. There are scattered orange scales. The hindwings are pale golden brown white darker lines towards the apex.

Etymology
The species name refers to Costa Rica, where the holotype was collected.

References

Moths described in 2001
Sparganothini